Milmore is a surname. Notable people with the surname include:

Jane Milmore (1955–2020), American playwright and actress
Jennifer Milmore (born 1969), American actress
Martin Milmore (1844–1883), American sculptor

See also
John Millmore, United States Navy sailor and Medal of Honor recipient